The Penn Quakers men's lacrosse team represents the University of Pennsylvania in National Collegiate Athletic Association (NCAA) Division I men's lacrosse. Penn competes as a member of the Ivy League and plays its home games at Franklin Field in Philadelphia.

History
The Penn lacrosse program dates back to 1900 and competes on historic Franklin Field, the oldest operating football stadium in the NCAA. Penn has won the Ivy League championship in 1983, 1984, 1986, 1988 and 2019.

Penn fielded a team at the club level in 1890, but played intermittently upon starting up lacrosse, and so lists 1900 as their first official season of varsity lacrosse.

The Quakers have advanced to the NCAA tournament twelve times, the most recent being in 2014. In 2014 Penn was seeded number four in the tournament, their highest seeding in over 20 years.

Penn had probably their finest season in 1988, with Chris Flynn making first team All American at midfield. Under coach Tony Seaman, the team reached the Final Four in the 1988 NCAA tournament, losing a close match to the Gait led Syracuse team, 11–10, a game in which Gary Gait performed his famous "Air Gait" goal.

In 2011, Penn went 8–7 under second-year coach Mike Murphy, defeating ranked opponents Duke and Princeton in the regular season before losing to 4th seeded Notre Dame in the NCAA tournament.

Penn has had 13 first team All Americans. Among the more notable of these players is attackman Peter Hollis, midfielder Josh Hall, and midfielder Chris Flynn who was also a prep school graduate of nearby Episcopal Academy.

Flynn made 1st and 2nd team All American in 1988 and 1987, respectively. He was also a three-time All-Ivy selection in football, a member
of the 1994 U.S. National Lacrosse Team and played professionally for the Philadelphia Wings.

Season Results
The following is a list of Penn's results by season as an NCAA Division I program:

{| class="wikitable"

|- align="center"

†NCAA cancelled 2020 collegiate activities due to the COVID-19 virus.
††Ivy League cancelled 2021 collegiate season due to the COVID-19 virus.

See also
 1988 NCAA Division I Men's Lacrosse Championship
 Lacrosse in Pennsylvania

References

External links